Sydney Wilson (born 6 April 1990 in Southend-on-Sea, Essex) is an English former professional snooker player.

Career 
Wilson began playing snooker at the age of three with his father teaching him the basics of the game. He later took lessons from Vic Harris, a former professional player. As a teenager, he beat most of the best players in his class and won several junior tournaments. At 15, he began playing in the Pontin's International Open Series. He participated for five seasons with his best finish being a second round defeat in 2009. Due to a lack of financial opportunities he had to sell his own snooker table and could not afford to practice full-time. In 2011 he played in Q School for the first time, but could not get beyond the third round. In the 2011–12 season he took part in seven of the twelve tournaments in the Players Tour Championship.

The following year he won a match in the main rounds of a PTC for the first time with a 4–2 success over Gerard Greene in the first event in Gloucester. Wilson was knocked out 4–3 by Dave Harold in the second round. In Q School, he lost in the fourth round in the second and third events. His high Q School Order of Merit placing gave him entry into many ranking event qualifiers for the 2013–14 season, but he was unable to win a match. Wilson made his debut at the venue stage of a ranking event at the 2014 Welsh Open and he led world number 11 Mark Allen 3–0 and made a break of 54 in the fourth frame. However, Allen responded by winning four successive frames to edge it 4–3, with Wilson stating afterwards that a kick in the fourth frame had ruined his chance of winning. He came within two wins of securing a professional tour card in the first event of Q School, but lost 4–3 to Duane Jones.

Wilson's only win during the 2014–15 season came at the 2015 German Masters when he defeated Anthony Hamilton 5–3, before losing by a reverse of this scoreline to Ryan Day. In the second round of the first event of Q School he defeated ex-professional Marcus Campbell. Wilson won three more matches to reach the final round and beat Chen Zhe 4–1 to seal his professional status for the first time. He has a two-year tour card starting with the 2015–16 season, with Wilson stating that his goal is to remain on tour. He won his first match on tour by beating Oliver Brown 5–2 in the first round of the 2015 Australian Goldfields Open qualifiers, before losing 5–2 to Jack Lisowski. At the UK Championship Wilson won a ranking event match at the venue stage for the first time in his career by seeing off Michael White, who at world number 15 was ranked 100 places higher than Wilson. He lost 6–2 to Mark Joyce in the subsequent round. In the German Masters qualifiers, Mike Dunn edged past Wilson 5–4 and by 86–79 points on the final black. Wilson defeated Gerard Greene 4–3 at the Welsh Open, but lost 4–1 to Matthew Selt in the second round.

Wilson opened the 2016–17 season with 11 straight defeats, before beating Dechawat Poomjaeng 4–2 at the Scottish Open. He was defeated 4–1 by Liang Wenbo in the second round. Wilson recorded a 10–6 victory over Kurt Maflin in the first round of World Championship qualifying, before losing 10–7 to Rory McLeod and was relegated from the tour after not getting past the third round of both Q School events.

Wilson has practiced in  Stepfield Snooker Club  in Witham, where two-time World Championship runner-up Ali Carter plays.

Performance and rankings timeline

References

External links 

 Statistics on Snooker.org

English snooker players
Sportspeople from Southend-on-Sea
1990 births
Living people